The governor of Rivers State is the chief executive of the Rivers State government and is one of the governors of the thirty-six states of Nigeria. The governor is supported by the deputy governor, both popularly elected for a term of four years (maximum of two terms). The governor, as head of the executive branch, has the power to appoint commissioners responsible for each of the state's ministries, the heads of parastatals, judicial officers and the state-owned bodies with specific regulatory or administrative duties. They cannot be a member of the state House of Assembly.

History

Since achieving statehood in 1967, fifteen individuals have held the power to govern Rivers State, a majority of whom were military officers. Alfred Diete-Spiff, a navy commander and member of the Supreme Military Council, served as the first military governor of the state, after it was created from part of the old Eastern Region, Nigeria. He held office from May 1967 until July 1975 during the administration of General Yakubu Gowon and is the state's only military governor to serve two consecutive four-year terms. In October 1979, Melford Okilo became the first elected governor of Rivers State and ruled until December 1983.

More recently, two governors in the state's history have served two consecutive terms. They are: Peter Odili (1999–2007) and Chibuike Amaechi (2007–2015). Rivers State's shortest-serving governor was Celestine Omehia who served only five months in office before the Supreme Court annulled his election on 25 October 2007.

Election and qualification
The governor and deputy governor are directly elected on the same ticket by popular vote for four-year terms, and are limited to two consecutive terms, for a total of eight years. Qualifications required for an individual aspiring to become the governor of Rivers State is contained in section 177 of the 1999 Constitution. According to the constitution, an individual may become governor if they meet the following eligibility criteria:

at least thirty-five (35) years of age;
a citizen of Rivers State by birth;
a member of a political party with endorsement by that political party;
School Certificate level or its equivalent.

Powers and functions

Executive powers
Most executive power lies with the governor whose responsibility is to enforce state laws. They serve as the head of government with supreme authority over the Executive Council. Excluding the deputy governor, they appoint commissioners, heads of government agencies, special advisers and judicial officers subject to the House's
approval. The governor has the duty to attract investments, promote business and implement political as well as economic initiatives.

Legislative powers
Under the Constitution, every bill passed by the House of Assembly must be presented to the governor for approval before it becomes law. The governor may choose to sign it and make it law, veto it and return it to the House, or take no action, however. If they veto the bill, a two-thirds majority of the House may override it, and the bill will become law without the governor's signature. If the governor does not act, the bill will automatically become law after a 30-day period.

Judicial powers
Judicial officers are appointed by the governor on the recommendation of the National Judicial Council subject to confirmation of the appointment by the Rivers State House of Assembly. Should a vacancy arise in the office of the Chief Judge or the President of the Customary Court of Appeal, the governor can appoint the next most senior judge of those courts to act for a period of three months.

Section 212, subsection (1) and (2) further empowers the chief executive to issue pardons and reprieves, commute sentences, or remit fines and forfeitures imposed for the commission of offenses against, or for the violation of the state laws. Such authority must be exercised on the advice of the Rivers State Advisory Committee on the Prerogative of Mercy, and should not be wielded independently.

Oath of office
Governors take the following oath:

I do solemnly swear that I will be faithful and bear true allegiance to the Federal Republic of Nigeria; that as the Governor of Rivers State, I will discharge my duties to the best of my ability, faithfully and in accordance with the Constitution of the Federal Republic of Nigeria and the law, and always in the interest of the sovereignty, integrity, solidarity, well-being and prosperity of the Federal Republic of Nigeria; that I will strive to preserve the fundamental objectives and directive principles of state policy contained in the Constitution of the Federal Republic of Nigeria; that I will exercise the authority vested in me as governor so as not to impede or prejudice the authority lawfully vested in the President of the Federal Republic of Nigeria and so as not to endanger the continuance of federal government in Nigeria; that I will not allow my personal interest to influence my official conduct or my official decisions; that I will to the best of my ability preserve, protect and defend the Constitution of the Federal Republic of Nigeria; that I will abide by the Code of Conduct contained in the Fifty Schedule to the Constitution of the Federal Republic of Nigeria; that in all circumstances, I will do right to all manner of people, according to law, without fear or favour, affection or ill-will; that I will not directly or indirectly communicate or reveal to any person any matter which shall be brought under my consideration or shall become known to me as Governor of Rivers State, except as may be required for the due discharge of my duties as governor; and that I will devote myself to the service and well-being of the people of Nigeria. So help me God.

Gubernatorial removal
Although a governor is normally elected to serve a complete four-year term during the national elections, in exceptional cases, before a term of such four years expires, the officeholder may be replaced or removed as the case may be, through death, impeachment or if an election is annulled by a competent court of law or by a two-thirds majority of the House of Assembly.

Latest election

See also
List of Governors of Rivers State by time in office
Government of Rivers State

References

External links

Official site of Governor's office

 
1979 establishments in Nigeria
1970s establishments in Rivers State
Executive Council of Rivers State